Major Lance (April 4, 1939, 1941 or 1942 – September 3, 1994) was an American R&B singer. After a number of US hits in the 1960s, including "The Monkey Time" and "Um, Um, Um, Um, Um, Um", he became an iconic figure in Britain in the 1970s among followers of Northern Soul. Although he stopped making records in 1982, Major Lance continued to perform at concerts and on tours until his death in 1994. His daughter, Keisha Lance Bottoms, was the 60th mayor of Atlanta.

Early life
There has been some dispute over Major Lance's birth year; some sources claimed he was born in 1941. or in 1942 (as Lance claimed). However, 1939 appears to be the correct year of his birth. In the 1940 U.S. Census, "Mager" Lance is listed in Washington County, Mississippi, as the one-year-old son of Lucendy Lance, a widow. Lance's gravestone also confirms he was born in 1939. 'Major' was his given name, not a nickname or stage name.

Lance, who was one of 12 children, moved as a child with his family to the midnorth side of Chicago in the Cabrini-Green projects, a high-crime area, where he developed a boyhood friendship with Otis Leavill, both of whom attended Wells High School. This was the same school Curtis Mayfield and Jerry Butler attended. Mayfield called Lance a "sparkly fellow, and a great basketball player, which is probably how we met. His hero was Jackie Wilson, and he was always coming round and looking through my bag for songs that I'd written but didn't want to do with the Impressions. He was pretty good at picking them, too."

Lance was also a baseball player. Lance and Otis both did boxing, and also singing as members of the Five Gospel Harmonaires. The two of them also worked together at a drug store.

Career

Beginnings
Lance and Otis Leavill formed a group named the Floats in the mid-1950s but broke up before recording any material. Lance became a featured dancer on a local television show, Time for Teens, and presenter Jim Lounsbury gave him a one-off record deal with Mercury Records. Mercury released his single "I Got a Girl", written and produced by Curtis Mayfield, in 1959; it was not successful. Lance worked at various jobs over the next few years.

Okeh Records
In 1962 he signed with Okeh Records on Mayfield's recommendation. Lance was constantly showing up at the Okeh offices, offering to run errands for Carl Davis, telling him about the record he'd once made and how he and Curtis Mayfield were friends from their childhood. His first single, "Delilah", was not successful, but it established his partnership with the writing and arranging team of Mayfield, Carl Davis, and Johnny Pate, often with members of Mayfield's group, the Impressions, on backing vocals. Together they developed a distinctive, Latin-tinged sound which epitomised Chicago soul in contrast to music recorded elsewhere.

The second Okeh single, "The Monkey Time" (also written by Curtis Mayfield), was Major Lance's first hit, became a No. 2 Billboard R&B chart and No. 8 pop hit in 1963. "The Monkey Time" became Okeh's first hit single in 10 years. "That was my introduction with working with Carl Davis," Pate said. "We had a ball, making some very great music."

A succession of hits followed quickly, including "Hey Little Girl", "Um, Um, Um, Um, Um, Um" (his biggest hit, reaching No. 5 in the US pop chart and No. 40 in the UK, where it was his only chart success), "The Matador" (the only one not written by Mayfield), "Rhythm", "Sometimes I Wonder", "Come See", and "Ain't It a Shame".

In 1965 Pate left Okeh, and Mayfield began to concentrate on working with his own group. Lance and Davis continued to work together; "Too Hot to Hold" was a minor hit, but they had diminishing success before Davis in turn left the company.

Touring in the United Kingdom
During the 1960s, Lance toured the UK, where he was supported by Bluesology, a band including pianist Reggie Dwight, later known as Elton John.

Over the next two years he worked with several producers, with only "Without a Doubt" becoming a minor hit in 1968. Soon afterwards Lance left Okeh and moved to Dakar Records, where he had the Top 40 R&B hit "Follow the Leader." He then moved to Mayfield's Curtom label, which resulted in his last two Top 40 R&B hits, "Stay Away from Me (I Love You Too Much)" and "Must Be Love Coming Down." "Stay Away from Me" was also listed No. 4 in Jet Magazines "Soul Brothers Top 20". He left Curtom in 1971 and recorded briefly for the Volt and Columbia labels.

In 1972, he relocated to England so as to capitalize on the success of his older records among fans of Northern Soul music in dance clubs that played mostly rare and obscure American soul and R&B records. According to one writer, "[T]he Major's contribution was truly phenomenal and unforgettable... [He] was to become legendary as a UK club act, known to deliver 110% at every performance." In 1972, while in England, he recorded an album, Major Lance's Greatest Hits Recorded Live at the Torch, at the Torch, a club in Stoke on Trent, which has been described as "perhaps the best Northern Soul album ever made."

Later career
Lance returned to Atlanta in 1974 and recorded an updated disco version of "Um, Um, Um, Um, Um, Um" for Playboy Records. He set up a new label, Osiris, with former Booker T and the MG's drummer Al Jackson, but again with little success, and his career hit a downward spiral. He briefly recorded for Motown Records, releasing the last-ever single on its Soul Records subsidiary, "I Never Thought I'd Be Losing You," in 1978. He later found that his recordings had become popular on the beach music circuit in the Carolinas, where he continued to undertake live performances. He recorded a comeback album, The Major's Back, and several tracks for the Kat Family label. His final performance was in June 1994 at the 11th Chicago Blues Festival.

Personal life
Major Lance was married to Christine (née Boular) Lance. He sired nine (9) children by different women.

Lance died in 1994 in his sleep from heart disease in Decatur, Georgia. He is buried at Washington Memory Gardens Cemetery in Homewood, Illinois.

His daughter (with Sylvia Robinson), Keisha Lance Bottoms, was the mayor of Atlanta, Georgia from 2018 to 2022.

Other
He was arrested twice in his lifetime. In 1965, he was arrested in violation of the Paternity Act. A Chicago woman, Para Lee Thomas, claimed she had a son by Lance, Ronnie Maurice Lance, born . She asserted that Lance had promised to pay her doctor and hospital bills of around $375 but had defaulted on these payments. Judge Benjamin J. Kanter issued a warrant for Lance's arrest, setting Lance's bond at $1,000.

After recording briefly for the Motown subsidiary label Soul, he was convicted of cocaine possession in 1978 and served a four-year prison term.

In 1987, Lance had a heart attack. He later became nearly blind from glaucoma. As a result, he made no more recordings.

Other media

On February 28, 1995, shortly after Lance's death, Sony released a CD collection called Everybody Loves a Good Time: Best of Major Lance. It features 40 recordings for Okeh from 1962 to 1967 on two discs. AllMusic reviewer Richie Unterberger gave the CD 4 and a half stars, calling it a "Delightful 40-song, double-CD compilation of Lance's best work for Okeh between 1962 and 1967, including all of the chart singles, quite a few misses and B-sides, five previously unreleased cuts, and some Curtis Mayfield songs from his debut LP." Sony later released a shorter version of the CD collection titled The Very Best of Major Lance.

Discography

Albums
 The Monkey Time (Okeh, 1963)
 Um, Um, Um, Um, Um, Um (Okeh, 1964)
 Major's Greatest Hits (Okeh, 1965)
 The Rhythm of Major Lance (Okeh, 1968)
 Major Lance's Greatest Hits Recorded Live at the Torch (Contempo, 1973)
 Now Arriving (Soul, 1978)
 The Major's Back (1983)
 Live at Hinkley (1986)
 The Very Best of Major Lance (Epic/Legacy EK 62243, 2000)
 Um, Um, Um, Um, Um, Um (Collectables 2003)

Singles

* Billboard magazine did not publish an R&B chart during 1964; these chart positions are from Cashbox magazine.

See also
Guests on Soul Train
Keisha Lance Bottoms (Daughter, Mayor of Atlanta)
List of acts who appeared on American Bandstand
List of disco artists (L-R)
List of soul musicians

References

External links

20th-century births
1994 deaths
American soul musicians
Singers from Chicago
Singers from Mississippi
Okeh Records artists
People from Washington County, Mississippi
Northern soul musicians
Year of birth uncertain
20th-century African-American male singers